USS Champlin may refer to the following ships of the United States Navy:

 , a  launched in 1918 and decommissioned in 1922; sunk in tests 1936
 , a  launched in 1942 and decommissioned in 1946; scrapped in 1972

Sources
 

United States Navy ship names